Jérissa, also El-Jarissa, is a town and commune in the Kef Governorate, Tunisia. As of 2004 it had a population of 11,298.

Economy
The town was developed around the largest iron mine in Tunisia. Despite a downward trend in production, it still produces 120,000 tons of good quality iron ore as of 2005, 60 percent of Tunisia's iron production. In 1960, 1.033 million tons were mined at Jerissa. The mine is operated by the Jebel Djerissa Company.

Culture
The festival of Sidi Yahia Jerissa is an annual event.

Sport
The Jerissa Football Club is a local football team.

People
Taoufik Ben Brik, a journalist and writer.
Mourad Melki, association football player.
Haythem nssitouh, the founder of the city.

See also
List of cities in Tunisia

References

Populated places in Tunisia
Communes of Tunisia